Echinussa is a genus of Malagasy jumping spiders that was first described by Eugène Louis Simon in 1901.  it contains only three species, found only on Madagascar: E. imerinensis, E. praedatoria, and E. vibrabunda.

References

Salticidae genera
Salticidae
Spiders of Madagascar